Optineurin is a protein that in humans is encoded by the OPTN gene.

Function 

This gene encodes the coiled-coil containing protein optineurin. Optineurin may play a role in normal-tension glaucoma and adult-onset primary open angle glaucoma. Optineurin interacts with adenovirus E3-14.7K protein and may utilize tumor necrosis factor-alpha or Fas-ligand pathways to mediate apoptosis, inflammation or vasoconstriction. Optineurin may also function in cellular morphogenesis and membrane trafficking, vesicle trafficking, and transcription activation through its interactions with the RAB8, huntingtin, and transcription factor IIIA proteins. Alternative splicing results in multiple transcript variants encoding the same protein. OPTN is a host intrinsic restriction factor against neuroinvasive HSV-1 infection.

Model organisms 

Model organisms have been used in the study of OPTN function. A conditional knockout mouse line, called Optntm1a(EUCOMM)Wtsi was generated as part of the International Knockout Mouse Consortium program – a high-throughput mutagenesis project to generate and distribute animal models of disease to interested scientists – at the Wellcome Trust Sanger Institute.

Male and female animals underwent a standardized phenotypic screen to determine the effects of deletion. Twenty one tests were carried out on mutant mice, however no significant abnormalities were observed.

Interactions 

Optineurin has been shown to interact with Huntingtin and RAB8A.

References

Further reading

External links 
 
 

Genes mutated in mice